The Border Vidette was a newspaper published in Nogales, Arizona with a slant towards the Democratic Party founded in 1894, by Harry Woods.  The original editor was Frank M. King, who purchased the paper in 1897.  King left in 1898 when Emory D. Miller purchased the paper.  He would remain the editor/publisher until the paper ceased operations in 1934.

References

Newspapers published in Arizona
Publications established in 1894
Weekly newspapers published in the United States